Thomas Trentham (1538–1587) was an English politician.

Thomas Trentham may also refer to:

Thomas Trentham (died 1519?), MP
Thomas Trentham (1575–1605), MP